Oscar is a platform game that was released on Amiga, Amiga CD32, and MS-DOS in 1993, and the Super Nintendo Entertainment System in 1996. It was developed and published by Flair Software. The CD32 version was bundled with the CD32 console on the same disc as the puzzle game Diggers. A Sega Genesis version planned but never released.

The player controls a character named Oscar through seven Hollywood-themed levels collecting Oscars.

Reception 

Computer Gaming World in April 1994 said that the PC version of Oscar was "another very average platformy, arcadey, bounce-'em-around" with "confusing" graphics. The magazine predicted that it "will only appeal to total platform addicts who will likely find something better to waggle their joysticks at anyway".

Legacy
In September 2009, the first sequel was released. It is called Oscar in Toyland, and it is themed around toys. The second sequel was released in February 2010, called Oscar in Movieland, and is themed around various movie genres. The third sequel was released in February 2011. It is called Oscar in Toyland 2, and is a sequel to Oscar in Toyland. About 5 months later, on July 28, the fourth and final sequel was released. It is called Oscar's World Tour, and the theme is going around the world. All of these sequels were only released on DSiWare.

References

External links

1993 video games
DOS games
Amiga games
Amiga 1200 games
Amiga CD32 games
Cancelled Sega Genesis games
Super Nintendo Entertainment System games
Video games about animals
Video games developed in the United Kingdom
Video games scored by Phillip Nixon
Flair Software games
Single-player video games